Manni is a town in Burkina Faso.

Manni may also refer to:

Places
Manni Department, a department or commune of Gnagna Province in Burkina Faso where the above town is located
Manni, Estonia, a village

People
Alessandro Manni (born 1974), retired Italian footballer
Domenico Maria Manni (1690 – 1788), Italian polymath, editor, and publisher
Ettore Manni (1927–1979), Italian film actor
Henry Manni (born 1992), Finnish paracanoer
Keijo Manni (born 1951), Finnish wrestler
Lodovico Manni (born 1998), Italian rugby union player
Nicoletta Manni (born 1991), Italian prima ballerina
Tarmo Manni (1921–1999), Finnish actor
Victoria Manni (born 1994), Italian ice dancer
nickname of Emmanuel Carella (born 1982), Australian pop singer
Manfred Manni Schmidt (born 1964), German heavy metal guitarist and songwriter
nickname of Manfred Seifert (1949–2005), German footballer
Manni Lal (born 1942), Indian politician
Manni Thofte (born 1953), Swedish former alpine skier

Fictional characters
one of the title characters of Nonni and Manni, a 1998 German children's television series
Manni Bessauer, a character in Manni, der Libero, a 1981 German television series

Hypocorisms